Paul Bernard Cliteur (born 6 September 1955) is a Dutch professor of jurisprudence at Leiden University, as well as a politician, philosopher, writer, publicist and columnist. He is known for his conservative perspective, his atheism, his republicanism, and his dislike of Islam. He is a member of De Vrije Gedachte. Since 2015, Cliteur is a member of the Dutch political party Forum voor Democratie, where he is chairman of the advisory board and the party's official think tank. In 2019 he was elected to be parliamentary group leader for Forum voor Democratie in the Dutch Senate.

Cliteur has also been on the board of several organisations, including supervisor of the Telders Foundation (think tank of the People's Party for Freedom and Democracy), and from 1993 until 1995 chair of the Humanist League (Humanistisch Verbond).

Lawyer and philosopher 
Cliteur studied law and philosophy, and graduated on 22 March 1989 with his dissertation Conservatisme en cultuurrecht ("Conservatism and cultural law", published in 2005 under the title Natuurrecht, Cultuurrecht, Conservatisme, "Natural law, Cultural law, Conservatism"). From 1995 until 2002, he was Professor of Philosophy at Delft University. He is Professor of Jurisprudence at Leiden University, where he delivered his maiden speech on 28 May 2004 on "The neutral state, particular education and multiculturalism". His activities mainly include law, cultural history, philosophy and ethics.

Columnist and publicist 
Cliteur is mainly known for his opining works, in which he expresses his political views. He served as a columnist for, amongst others, Trouw, and had a spoken column in the TV show Buitenhof. In these, he first and foremost expresses his liberal opinions, his own vision of multiculturism, and also advocates for animal rights.

In March 2004, Cliteur told Het Parool in an interview that he felt he was being limited in freely expressing his opinions on Islam after others branded him a "racist" and "stigmatiser". This was partly due to an AIVD report, which argued criticism of Islam is counterproductive for the social integration of Muslims. Cliteur felt it necessary to moderate the tone of his spoken columns for Buitenhof. After being criticised for taking this position, he decided to terminate his contributions to Buitenhof completely, because he regarded himself to be no longer credible.

An overview of his philosophy is described in Dirk Verhofstadt in gesprek met Paul Cliteur. Een zoektocht naar harmonie (2012), an in-depth interview between Dirk Verhofstadt and Paul Cliteur on Enlightenment values such as the freedom of speech, separation of church and state, the right to self-determination and the equality of every human being.

Political career
Cliteur is regarded as one of the founding fathers of the right-wing party populist party Forum for Democracy, and he was a mentor for the party's leader, Thierry Baudet, whose doctoral dissertation he directed, a dissertation seen as the ideological source for the "anti-immigration, anti-European Union party" Baudet founded later. Cliteur has been connected to the party since 2015, and in 2019 was elected to the Dutch Senate. In 2020, after the discovery of racist text messages circulating within party groups, he stood down as Senate group leader but remained a member of the FvD.

Works 
Written in his capacity as a lawyer
Humanistische filosofie ("Humanist Philosophy"), 1990
Filosofen van het Hedendaags Liberalisme ("Philosophers of Present-Day Liberalism"), co-author, 1990
Filosofen van het Klassieke Liberalisme ("Philosophers of Classical Liberalism"), co-author, 1993
Rechtsfilosofische stromingen van de twintigste eeuw ("Schools of Philosophy of Law in the Twentieth Century"), 1997
De filosofie van mensenrechten ("The Philosophy of Human Rights"), 1999
Rechtsfilosofie, een Thematische Inleiding ("Philosophy of Law, a Thematic Introduction"), 2001
Verscheidenheid en Verdraagzaamheid. Op de Bres voor Tolerantie ("Diversity and Tolerance. In Defence of Toleration"), 2001
Inleiding in het Recht ("Introduction to Law"), 2001
Natuurrecht, Cultuurrecht, Conservatisme ("Natural law, Cultural law, Conservatism"), 2005, dissertation
The Secular Outlook: In Defense of Moral and Political Secularism, 2010. Wiley-Blackwell
Written in his capacity as Socrates Professor
Onze verhouding tot de apen; de consequenties van het Darwinisme voor ons mensbeeld en voor de moraal ("Our Relation to the Apes"; the Consequences of Darwinism for Our View of Humanity and Morality), maiden speech, 1995
Written in his capacity as a publicist
Darwin, dier en recht ("Darwin, Animals and Rights"), 2001
Moderne Papoea's ("Modern Papuas"), 2002
Tegen de Decadentie ("Against Decadence"), 2003
God houdt niet van vrijzinnigheid ("God Does Not Like Liberalism"), Bert Bakker (Amsterdam, 2004), 
Moreel Esperanto ("Moral Esperanto"), 2007 (nl)
Het Monotheïstisch dilemma ("The Monotheist Dilemma"), 2010, Uitg. De Arbeiderspers
Dirk Verhofstadt in gesprek met Paul Cliteur. Een zoektocht naar harmonie ("Dirk Verhofstadt in Conversation with Paul Cliteur. A Quest for Harmony"), 2012, Houtekiet
De succesvolle mislukking van Europa ("The Successful Failure of Europe"), as co-editor with Frits Bolkestein and Meindert Fennema, 2015, Houtekiet
Het Atheïstisch Woordenboek ("The Atheist Dictionary") with Dirk Verhofstadt as co-author, 2015, Houtekiet
Lecture on audio cd
Humanisme. Een hoorcollege over vrijdenken, atheïsme, politiek en moraal ("Humanism. A Lecture on Freethought, Atheism, Politics and Morality"), Home Academy Publishers (The Hague, 2006)

Further information 

In his spoken column in the 1 December 2002 episode of Buitenhof, Cliteur favourably discussed Francesco Carotta's theory that Jesus is, in fact, a transformed character of Julius Caesar, originating from erroneous copying. In the 23 December 2002 Nova episode, he called Carotta's theory a "discovery equal to the views of Darwin and Galileo, which overturns all of cultural history". This belief was mocked by Nijmegen's classical historian Anton van Hooff, who dubbed it 'atheist superstition'.
The JOVD (Youth Organisation Freedom and Democracy) awarded him the prize for Liberal of the Year 2002.

References

External links 

 Leiden University profile
 Paul Cliteur at Liberales (March 2007)

1955 births
Living people
20th-century atheists
21st-century atheists
Cultural historians
Academic staff of the Delft University of Technology
Dutch animal rights activists
Dutch atheists
Dutch columnists
Dutch humanists
Dutch legal scholars
20th-century Dutch philosophers
21st-century Dutch philosophers
Dutch republicans
Forum for Democracy (Netherlands) politicians
Leiden University alumni
Academic staff of Leiden University
Members of the Senate (Netherlands)
Dutch scholars of Islam
Party for the Animals
Politicians from Amsterdam